Yuki Tsubota (born February 3, 1994) is a Canadian freestyle skier of Japanese descent. She competed for Canada at the 2014 Winter Olympics in the slopestyle event. Tsubota crashed in the final run of the slopestyle event, suffering a concussion and broken cheekbone and finishing sixth. She competed in the slopestyle event in the 2018 Winter Olympics as well, again finishing in sixth place.

References

1994 births
Canadian female freestyle skiers
Living people
Skiers from Vancouver
Canadian sportspeople of Japanese descent
Freestyle skiers at the 2014 Winter Olympics
Freestyle skiers at the 2018 Winter Olympics
Olympic freestyle skiers of Canada